Baraboi is a name of several geographic features in the Eastern Europe Black Sea region.

Bodies of water
 Baraboi River (disambiguation)
 Baraboi Reservoir

Populated places
 Baraboi, Donduşeni, a commune in Donduşeni district, Moldova
 Baraboi (Ovidiopol Raion), a village in Ovidiopol Raion, Ukraine